Loblaw is a Canadian retailing conglomerate.

Loblaw, Loblaws, or similar may also refer to:

 Loblaws, a Canadian supermarket brand, originator of the conglomerate
 Bob Loblaw, a fictional character from Arrested Development
 Theodore Loblaw (1872–1933), Canadian grocer and founder of the Loblaw's brand and corporation